Tom Cotter may refer to:

 Tom Cotter (comedian) (born 1963), American comedian
 Tom Cotter (environmentalist) (born 1972), American environmentalist and social entrepreneur
 Tom Cotter (baseball) (1866–1906), Major League Baseball catcher